Salbaş can refer to:

 Salbaş, Karaisalı
 Salbaş, Ortaköy